Williams Martínez Fracchia (18 December 1982 – 17 July 2021) was a Uruguayan professional footballer who played as a centre-back.

Club career
Martínez signed on loan for West Bromwich Albion of the Premier League in January 2006 until the end of the season, and made his Premier League debut as a half-time substitute against Fulham at Craven Cottage on 11 February 2006, a 6–1 defeat. He scored his first goal for the English club on 7 May 2006, an away game at Everton, also his first start for the club, while also conceding a late penalty that gave Everton a 2–2 draw.

In January 2008, he signed a two-and-a-half-year deal with Valenciennes, and was loaned to Reims for the 2008–09 season. On 17 August 2009, upon his request, he was released by Valenciennes and  signed by his former club Defensor Sporting.

International career
Martínez made his debut for the Uruguay national team in the 2003 Lunar New Year Cup.

Death 
Martínez died on 17 July 2021 of suicide, aged 38, as a result of a depression caused by COVID-19-related inactivity. At the time of his death, he was playing for Villa Teresa.

References

External links
 
 tenfieldigital profile 
 
 

1982 births
2021 deaths
2021 suicides
Footballers from Montevideo
Uruguayan footballers
Association football central defenders
Uruguay international footballers
Defensor Sporting players
Chacarita Juniors footballers
West Bromwich Albion F.C. players
Valenciennes FC players
Stade de Reims players
C.D. Huachipato footballers
Club Deportivo Palestino footballers
Cerro Porteño players
Club Atlético River Plate (Montevideo) players
C.A. Cerro players
Deportivo Táchira F.C. players
Rampla Juniors players
Uruguayan Primera División players
Premier League players
Ligue 1 players
Chilean Primera División players
Uruguayan expatriate footballers
Expatriate footballers in Chile
Expatriate footballers in Argentina
Expatriate footballers in Paraguay
Expatriate footballers in England
Expatriate footballers in France
Expatriate footballers in Venezuela
Uruguayan sportspeople of Italian descent
Uruguayan expatriate sportspeople in Chile
Uruguayan expatriate sportspeople in England
Uruguayan expatriate sportspeople in Argentina
Uruguayan expatriate sportspeople in Paraguay
Uruguayan expatriate sportspeople in France
Suicides in Uruguay